John Boultbee may refer to:

 John Boultbee (explorer) (1799–1854), explorer of New Zealand
 John Boultbee (sport administrator) (born 1950), Australian sport administrator
 John Boultbee (artist) (1753–1812), English painter of equestrian and other sporting subjects